The Pahiatua Railcar Society (PRS) is a society located in Pahiatua, New Zealand, dedicated to the restoration of railcars and other locomotives and rolling stock formerly operated by the New Zealand Railways Department.  It is notable for possessing the sole remaining examples of the RM class 88 seater and Wairarapa railcars.

Having restored Standard class railcar Rm 31 to mainline standard for use on the national railway network, the Society ran its first revenue services on the Wairarapa Line at an open day on 12 February 2012.

Infrastructure 

The PRS is based at Pahiatua's railway station on the Wairarapa Line and has preserved the station building, goods shed, and surrounds. The railway station is a wooden structure that dates from 1971 and was built to replace a former building from 1897 that had been demolished. It is one of the last wooden stations built by the New Zealand Railways Department and one of the few remaining examples of its type. The goods shed dates from 1897 and is one of the larger rural goods sheds to survive in New Zealand. The PRS has added its own structures to the station precinct: a railcar shed for storage and restoration work, and another shed to provide shelter for the society's rolling stock.

Rolling stock

NZR Railcars

Diesel locomotives

Wagons  

Rm 31 is the society's only operating railcar and is one of four preserved railcars of the Standard class.  The PRS is actively restoring Rm 5, which has had to be largely rebuilt due to its rotten wooden frame, and Rm 121.  Parts of Rm 119 and Rm 133 are being used on Rm 121.  It used to be believed that no 88 seater railcar would survive for preservation, but the PRS and the Rm 133 Railcar Trust Board recovered Rm 133 from its resting place at Auckland International Airport where it had been used by the rescue services for training.  As both ends were affected by a fire, it has subsequently been decided to dedicate all efforts to the restoration of Rm 121. Both ends of Rm 121 have now been recovered and other parts have been sourced from the remnants of Rm 133 and Rm 119.  The society aims to fully rebuild an operational 88 seater.

The two TR locomotives are small shunting locomotives, and the PWD D class is another shunting locomotive that was solely operated by the PWD on its construction projects and never owned by the Railways Department.  The Society also possesses three jiggers (surfacemen's trolleys), two motorised and one hand-powered, and the turntable from Thames.  The society's collection of rolling stock includes both four-wheel and bogie wagons of an array of types, from a guard's van to cement and sheep wagons.

In September 2020, the Society announced it had bought the three recently-retired Silver Fern Railcars off of KiwiRail.

References

External links
 

Railway museums in New Zealand
Museums in the Wellington Region